Vacant World is the first studio album by Jacks. It was released on September 10, 1968. In 2007, Rolling Stone Japan placed it at number 13 on its list of the "100 Greatest Japanese Rock Albums of All Time".

Track listing

Personnel
Credits adapted from the liner notes.
 Yoshio Hayakawa – vocals, guitar
 Haruo Mizuhashi – guitar, vocals
 Hitoshi Tanino – bass guitar
 Takasuke Kida – drums, flute

References

External links
 

1968 debut albums
Jacks (band) albums